Eliáš Galajda (1 August 1931 in Čertižné, Czechoslovakia [now Slovakia] – 10 August 2017 in Košice) was a Ukrainian writer with Slovak citizenship.

Background 
He attended primary school in the village where he was born. Eliáš studied eight years at National Russian Gymnasium in Humenné where he graduated in 1951. After his studies he stayed to teach at the Gymnasium for the next year and then went to study Russian and Ukraine language at Faculty of Philosophy, Charles University in Prague (1952–1953). After one year he was chosen to attend The Faculty of Philology of the Saratov Chernyshevsky State University (1953–1955) and Faculty of Philology of Lomonosov Moscow State University where he graduated in 1958.

Professional life 
In 1958 he started to work as an editor in editorial office of "Dukľa" a "Družno vpered" in Prešov, Slovakia. Between 1960 and 1999 Eliáš worked as an assistant and later as an assistant professor and an associate professor at the Department of Russian language and literature in Prešov under Philosophy Faculty, Pavol Jozef Šafárik University, Košice now University of Prešov. In 1970 during Summer term lectured the Russian language on Modern Languages Centre of University of Bradford. After his career as lecturer and tutor he has retired and currently lives in Prešov. 
Eliáš became a member of the Association of Slovak writers in 1982. He is also a member of the Association of Ukrainian writers in Slovakia a member of Association of Slovak writers organisations and The National Writer's Union of Ukraine.
Eliáš Galajda has gained The Award of Ivan Franko for his contribution to literature and International Literature Award of Ivan Košelivec in 2010 for his story Word for skylarks (Slovo prozhaivoronkiv) published in Uninion (Sobornist No 1-2 2010).
Eliáš Galajda lived and worked in Prešov until end of life, died in hospital in Košice after short hard illness. He is buried at the town cemetery in Prešov.

Works

Poetries
Eliáš entered the world of literature in the early 1960s with his first collection of poems published within collective work of writers The Eight (Vosmero, 1963). In 1974, he debuted successfully with the wide poem collection Flame ups (Spalakhi). One could feel his growing up and reaching the poetry maturity in his collections The thirst of the Heart and the Land (Spraha sertsia i zemli, 1981), Insomnia (Bezsonya, 1986), The Ballad for three suns (Balada pro tri sontsia, 1991), especially in the poems devoted to his homeland, childhood memories and those with themes where he confronts his inner world with harsh reality.
He dived deeper into lyric (emotional) contemplation of destiny and perspective of man as such in poem collections Mountains, Blue Mountains (Hori sini, hori, 1990) and My everyday sadness (Moia petchalj povsiakdenna, 1994).
The Union of Rusyn-Ukrain writers of Slovak republic honored the 40 Anniversary of his work and publishments by bibliography Crane birds calling (Zhuravlinnyij klič, 1998). He continued to publish with his poem collections as: Restlessness paves the way (Trivohami doroha stelitjsia, 2001), Forgotten notebooks verses (Virshi iz zabutikh zoshitiv, 2006) and Autumn reflections (Osinni refleksii, 2011).

Proses
The poet Eliáš Galajda expressed himself also with prose in short stories and novels:  When the rain is coming (Koli idutj doshchi, 1980) a Still sings a skylark  (Cshe spivaie zhaivoronok, 1989).

Anthologies
Solar wells (Soňačni krynyci, 1977) Anthology of poetry of the Ukraine writers in Slovakia 
From forge of time (Iz kuzni času, 2007) Anthology of contemporary Slovak poetry (Z vyhne času, 2007).

Translations
Eliáš has been active in translating from Ukrainian and Russian language to Slovak language and vice versa.  He translated the Bernardo Guimarães novel Izaura (1995) from Russian to Slovak language, the work of Jozef Leikert Transientness (Pominutelnost, 2006).

His Works translated
A part of Eliáš's work had been translated into Slovak language and published in collective works of writers such as Heart as a sun (Srdce ako since 1892),Such moments exist (Sú také chvíle 2002). Or in Czech collective work of writers Dawning under Carphatians (Rano pod Karpatami 1983), short stories and poems in Hungarian translation Carphatian song (A Karpátok éneke 1988). Some samples of his poems were also published in the anthology of short stories of Ukrainian nationality writers in CSSR – Roots (Korene 1990).

References

External links
 Eliáš Galajda (1931): Personal Bibliography: Selected Bibliography by author Firkaľová Mária
 Eliáš Galajda - Ukrainian poet and translator: (The life and works) by authors Ňachajová Mária, Kundrát Juraj 
 Illia Galajda - The personality comprehensively (O personalitate complexă) at Portraits and books II (Portrete şi cărţi II) by author Onufrie Vinţeler, EIKON, Kluj-Napoca, 2007, p.24-34, 434 Pgs 
 Ilja Galajda at Time and life (Čas i žitťa) by author Mikola Zimomria, Drohobič, 2012, p.183-190, 643 Pgs 

1931 births
2017 deaths
Moscow State University alumni
Slovak poets
Ukrainian poets
Slovak people of Ukrainian descent
Slovak educators
Academic staff of the University of Prešov
Rusyn poets
Slovak people of Rusyn descent